Star Bharat ( formerly Life Ok) is an Indian Hindi language general entertainment pay television channel owned by The Walt Disney Company India. a wholly owned by The Walt Disney Company. it's primarily telecasts dramas, crime and comedy shows.

History
The channel was first launched as Star One, an Indian subscription-television youth channel that primarily broadcast in Hindi on 1 November 2004. Part of News Corporation's Star TV network in Asia and distributed internationally by Fox International Channels. In November 2006, Star One, along with Star Gold, launched in the UK on Sky.
 
Star One was rebranded as Life OK in India on 18 December 2011. It was then rebranded again on 28 August 2017 as Star Bharat.

On 30 December 2020, Disney announced that the Star branding would be replaced with the Utsav branding from 22 January 2021. On 22 January 2021, Star Bharat became Utsav Bharat, and this change is currently effective in parts of Europe.

Star Bharat rebranded with a new logo and graphics package on 25 July 2022, during the finale of the wedding reality show Swayamvar - Mika Di Vohti. The new slogan is Dil Deke Dekho Zara (Give Your Heart and See). The Star wordmark in the logo is no longer uppercase but is now identical to the Star wordmark in the logos of Star Jalsha, Star Pravah, Star Suvarna and the newly launched Star Kiran. The new graphics package is based on colourful flowing saree-like textiles against a light blue background, the same colour that was adopted by Star Suvarna during its rebrand in late 2020.

Programming

In conjunction with the 2022 rebranding, as the revised tagline alludes, the channel's broadcast programming will now focus on romantic theme elements in their offerings.

References

Hindi-language television channels in India
Television stations in Mumbai
Television channels and stations established in 2017
Disney Star